Herman Conway (11 October 1908 – 1983) was an English professional association footballer who played as a goalkeeper.

He began his career with his local Midland League club, Gainsborough Trinity, establishing himself as their regular first-team goalkeeper from mid-March 1929 onwards. In February 1930 he was transferred to Burnley, having been scouted for them by former Burnley goalkeeper Jerry Dawson.

Conway played over 200 matches in the Football League with Burnley and West Ham United. During the first half of season 1939-40 he played for Tunbridge Wells Rangers before his career was interrupted by the Second World War. In August 1945 he signed for Southend United, where he remained until his retirement as a player in May 1946.

Notes

1908 births
1983 deaths
People from Gainsborough, Lincolnshire
English footballers
Association football goalkeepers
Gainsborough Trinity F.C. players
Burnley F.C. players
West Ham United F.C. players
Southend United F.C. players
English Football League players
Tunbridge Wells F.C. players